In population ecology and demography, the net reproduction rate, R0, is the average number of offspring (often specifically daughters) that would be born to a female if she passed through her lifetime conforming to the age-specific fertility and mortality rates of a given year. This rate is similar to the gross reproduction rate but takes into account that some females will die before completing their childbearing years. An R0 of one means that each generation of mothers is having exactly enough daughters to replace themselves in the population. If the R0 is less than one, the reproductive performance of the population is below replacement level.

The R0 is particularly relevant where sex ratios at birth are significantly affected by the use of reproductive technologies, or where life expectancy is low.

The current (2015–20) estimate for the R0 worldwide under the UN's medium variant model is 1.09 daughters per woman.

See also
List of countries by net reproduction rate
Sub-replacement fertility
Total fertility rate

References

External links
Net reproduction rate (daughters per woman), UNdata.

Human geography
Fertility
Demographic economics
Rates
Population ecology